Gerardo di Tolla Barraza (born 31 March 1943) is a Peruvian sprinter. He competed in the men's 100 metres at the 1964 Summer Olympics. Di Tolla finished fourth in the 200 metres and fifth in the 100 metres at the 1963 Pan American Games.

References

1943 births
Living people
Athletes (track and field) at the 1964 Summer Olympics
Peruvian male sprinters
Olympic athletes of Peru
Athletes (track and field) at the 1963 Pan American Games
Pan American Games competitors for Peru
Place of birth missing (living people)